America America is a 1983 Indian Malayalam film, directed by I. V. Sasi. The film stars Mammootty, Lakshmi, Ratheesh and Balan K. Nair in the lead roles. The film has musical score by Shyam.

Cast
Mammootty as Ramesh 
Lakshmi as Anuradha
Ratheesh as Vijay
Balan K. Nair as Jackson
Seema as Neena
Pratap Pothen as Baby
K.P. Ummer as Capt RK Menon
 Tara Vijayan as Sithara

Soundtrack
The music was composed by Shyam and the lyrics were written by Bichu Thirumala.

References

External links
 

1983 films
1980s Malayalam-language films
Films scored by Shyam (composer)
Films directed by I. V. Sasi
Films set in the United States